Covington is a ghost town in Dakota County, Nebraska, United States.

History
A post office was established at Covington in 1858, and remained in operation until it was discontinued in 1893. It took its name from the Covington, Columbus and Black Hills Railroad. A special election in 1893 approved the merger of Covington and Stanton into the city of South Sioux City.

References

Further reading
 J R Johnson, “Covington, Nebraska’s Sinful City,” Nebraska History 49 (1968): 268-281

Geography of Dakota County, Nebraska
Ghost towns in Nebraska